Chihayafuru is an anime series adapted from the manga of the same title by Yuki Suetsugu, produced by Madhouse and directed by Morio Asaka, with Kunihiko Hamada designing the characters and Kousuke Yamashita composing the music. The story follows Chihaya Ayase, a girl who is inspired by a classmate to take up competitive karuta, with the dream of forming a club and reaching the national tournament. The series aired on Nippon Television between 4 October 2011, and 27 March 2012, and was also simulcast by Crunchyroll. The series was released in 9 volumes on DVD and Blu-ray Disc between 21 December 2011, and 22 August 2012, and as a complete set on Blu-ray Disc on 18 July 2013. Animax Asia aired their English adaptation of the first series from 13 February to 18 March 2013. A second season, Chihayafuru 2, aired in Japan between 11 January and 28 June 2013, and was also simulcast by Crunchyroll. Episode 26 did not air on television and instead was released as an original animation DVD on 13 September 2013, together with the limited edition of the 22nd volume of the manga. The third season aired from 22 October 2019, to 24 March 2020.

Series overview

Episode list

Chihayafuru (2011)

Chihayafuru 2 (2013)

Chihayafuru 3 (2019)

Notes

References

External links
Official NTV website 

Chihayafuru